The 2016 Schauinsland-Reisen-Cup was a summer football friendly tournament organized by MSV Duisburg and Match IQ. It was hosted by MSV Duisburg at the Schauinsland-Reisen-Arena in Duisburg, on 17 July 2016. Alongside the hosts, Eintracht Frankfurt (Germany), Hertha BSC (Germany), and Nantes (France) also took part. It was sponsored by Schauinsland-Reisen.

Overview

Participants

Bracket

Matches
All matches lasted for just 45 minutes. If a match was level after normal time then a penalty shoot-out was played to decide who advanced.

Semi-finals

Third place play-off

Final

Goalscorers

Media coverage

References

External links

2016–17 in French football
2016–17 in German football